Youth group may refer to:

 Youth organization
 Youth club, a social and activities club for young people
 Youth ministry, an age-specific type of religious ministry
 Youth Group, an Australian band